Gideon was a late 1970s/early 1980s animated French children's television series.

This basic animation was centered on Gideon, a duck with an unusually long neck. Gideon's abnormality was the subject of cruel taunts and jibes from the other ducks – who all had normal length necks – but good always came out in the end.

Gideon originated as a series of French storybooks, written by Benjamin Rabier in 1923, under the name Gédéon. In the 1970s French television produced the cartoon series, directed and co-written by Michel Ocelot made into 60 5 minute episodes, which was then sold to the United Kingdom television company Yorkshire Television and made into an English-language version and the original French 60 5 minute episodes was edited into 30 10 minute episodes each episode having 2 episodes merged into one story. It was directed by Steve Haynes and featured music by Alan Parker ex Blue Mink. It was shown on ITV between 1979 and 1981 with repeats until 1985

Goodie Tim Brooke-Taylor narrated the series, as well as providing all the voices – he estimated he had to do around 57 voices for all the various characters, which included Winston the circus dog, Cornelia the tortoise, Stalker the poacher and even flying rabbits.

Characters
 Growler the dog
 Sosthène the rabbit
 Grognard the dog
 Bout-de-zan the monkey
 Boudinet the pig
 Noiraud the crow
 Mimolette the mouse

References

External links
 Gédéon at Le Palais des dessins animés

1970s French animated television series
Films directed by Michel Ocelot